The New Zealand Society of Physiotherapists (NZSP) is a professional body of physiotherapists in New Zealand. Membership of the society is optional, but demonstrates that a particular practitioner upholds certain standards including adherence to a code of conduct. Individuals who meet certain criteria may indicate their membership by using the letters MNZSP or FNZSP after their names.

History
The society was established in 1950.

Membership classes
Member: Must be a New Zealand registered physiotherapist. A member may use the letters 'MNZSP' to indicate their membership.
Associate: This is the class held by a student who wishes to join the society.
Affiliate: A physiotherapy assistant working under supervision of a registered physiotherapist may hold this class.
Fellow: This class is bestowed upon members at the discretion of the society. Those with this class of membership may use the letters FNZSP.

Motto
The motto, in Māori, is "kia akotahi tatou, kia kotahi ra" (let's learn and grow together).

Branches
The society is made up of branches which represent geographical regions around the country. Each member of the society belongs to and is represented by a branch for the region in which they reside.

The branches are:

Auckland
Canterbury
Hawkes Bay
Middle Districts
Nelson and Marlborough
Northland
North Shore
Otago
Southland
Waikato and Bay of Plenty
Wellington

Special interest groups
The society also supports a number of groups of practitioners who are interested in particular specialities within the profession. Membership of a special interest group is optional.

The following special interest groups exist:

Cardiothoracic
Continence and Women's Health
Hand Therapists
Neurology
New Zealand Manipulative Physiotherapists Association
New Zealand Private Physiotherapy Association
New Zealand Sports and Orthopaedic Physiotherapy Association
Occupational Health
Paediatric
Physiotherapy Acupuncture Association of New Zealand
Physiotherapy for the Older Adult
Stress Management and Related Therapies

See also
 Physiotherapy

References

External links
Official Website
Percussive Massage Therapy

Medical and health organisations based in New Zealand
Physiotherapists